Beardsley is a populated place situated within the Sun City West CDP in Maricopa County, Arizona, United States.

History
The town began in 1880 around a railroad station. Much of town was bulldozed in the 1940s to make way for the railroad.

Beardsley's population was 12 in the 1960 census.

References

Populated places in Maricopa County, Arizona